ASPE Jugadores de Pelota S.L. is a sports management company dedicated to promote Basque pelota.

History 
The company was established in 1998, taking place ever since in the Cuatro y Medio, Doubles-pelota and hand-pelota categories. 
ASPE takes part also in the formation of pelotaris supporting aficionados and schools dedicated to the sport.

Sponsored Players

References

External links 
ASPE official website
 

Basque pelota
Companies based in Navarre
Basque pelota in Spain